Lake Stevens School District refers to the school district of Lake Stevens, Washington, United States. 

There are 7 elementary schools, 2 middle schools, 1 mid-high school, and 1 high schools in this district.

Schools

High schools
 Lake Stevens High School

Mid-High School
 Cavelero Mid-High School

Middle schools
 Lake Stevens Middle School
 North Lake Middle School

Elementary schools
 Glenwood Elementary School
 Highland Elementary School
 Hillcrest Elementary School
 Mt. Pilchuck Elementary School
 Skyline Elementary School
 Sunnycrest Elementary School
 Stevens Creek Elementary School

Current school board members

 John Boerger - President
 Kevin Plemel - Vice President
 Paul Lund - Board Member
 Mari Taylor - Board Member
 David Iseminger - Board Member
 Ken Collins - Superintendent

External links 
 Lake Stevens School District

School districts in Washington (state)
Education in Snohomish County, Washington